Ronnie Jerome Battle (born March 27, 1959) is a former American football tight end who played two seasons in the National Football League. He was drafted by the Los Angeles Rams in the seventh round of the 1981 NFL Draft. He played college football at North Texas.

He is the father of NFL wide receiver Arnaz Battle.

Early years
Battle attended Southwood High School in Shreveport, Louisiana.

College career
Battle played college football at North Texas.

Professional career

Los Angeles Rams
Battle was drafted by the Los Angeles Rams in the seventh round (175th overall) of the 1981 NFL Draft. He appeared in four games as a rookie but did not record any statistics.

In 1982, Battle played in nine games for the Rams. He finished the season with two receptions for 62 yards and a touchdown. He also carried the ball once for one yard.

He left the NFL and professional football after the 1982 season due to a career ending thumb injury.

References

1959 births
Living people
Players of American football from Shreveport, Louisiana
American football tight ends
North Texas Mean Green football players
Los Angeles Rams players